0L (zero L) or 0-L may refer to:

In law school, a person has been accepted to law school but he or she has not started the first year (1L) yet.

0L, abbreviation for 0 longitude, or the Prime meridian
0L, an abbreviation in physics for Zeroth law of thermodynamics
0L, an abbreviation in rocketry for Zero length launch
0L, an abbreviation for zero in the Lebesgue measure
0L, an abbreviation in aerodynamics for Zero lift axis
Zero-lift drag coefficient
0L, an abbreviation for Zero-length spring, a hypothetical type of Spring (device)

See also
L0 (disambiguation)